Didianema pauli is a species of sea snail, a marine gastropod mollusk in the family Skeneidae.

Description
The height of the shell attains 1.7 mm.

Distribution
This species occurs in the Gulf of Mexico; in the Atlantic Ocean off North Carolina to Florida.

References

 Pilsbry, H. A. and T. L. McGinty. 1945. Cyclostrematidae and Vitrinellidae of Florida--I. Nautilus 59: 1–13, pls. 1–2
 Rosenberg, G., F. Moretzsohn, and E. F. García. 2009. Gastropoda (Mollusca) of the Gulf of Mexico, Pp. 579–699 in Felder, D.L. and D.K. Camp (eds.), Gulf of Mexico–Origins, Waters, and Biota. Biodiversity. Texas A&M Press, College Station, Texas

External links

pauli
Gastropods described in 1945